Mozo is a Spanish surname. Notable people with the name include:

 Alan Mozo  (born 1997), Mexican association football player
 Alejandro Gutiérrez Mozo (born 1995), Spanish association football player
 Belén Mozo (born 1988), Spanish professional golfer
 Nicolás de Vergara el Mozo (1540–1606), Spanish sculptor, architect, ironworker and glazier

See also
 Mouzo, surname